Alfred Ambrose Chew Leete (1882–1933) was a British graphic artist. Born at Thorpe Achurch, Northamptonshire, he studied at Kingsholme School and The School of Science and Art (now Weston College) in Weston-super-Mare, before moving to London in 1899 and taking a post as an artist with a printer.

His career as a paid artist began in 1897, when the Daily Graphic accepted one of his drawings. Later, he contributed regularly to a number of magazines, including Punch, the Strand Magazine and Tatler. As a commercial artist he designed numerous posters and advertisements, especially in the 1910s and 1920s, for such brands as Rowntree's, Guinness and Bovril, and his series of advertisements for the Underground Electric Railways Company (the London Underground) are very well known.

His work as a wartime propagandist includes the poster for which he is most renowned, the Lord Kitchener poster design, which first appeared on the cover of the weekly magazine London Opinion on 5 September 1914. "His prolific output was characterized by its humour, keen observation of the everyday, and an eye for strong design."

During the First World War Leete also drew two comics Schmidt the Spy and The Bosch Book, which ridiculed the German army.

Leete died of a seizure, following a heart attack, at his home in Pembroke Square, London, in 1933. He had suffered from high blood pressure and heart trouble, and had been taken ill three weeks earlier in Italy. The Rome Express was stopped at Genoa to allow him to return to England.

In 2004, his work was displayed in his native Weston, at the Weston Museum.

References

1882 births
1933 deaths
British graphic designers
British poster artists
British cartoonists
British comics artists
Advertising artists and illustrators
People from North Northamptonshire
Artists' Rifles soldiers